Eduard Sergeyevich Gikayev (born 14 August 1979) is a former Russian professional footballer.

Club career
He made his debut in the Russian Premier League in 2001 for FC Alania Vladikavkaz.

References

1979 births
Footballers from Tbilisi
Living people
Russian footballers
FC Spartak Vladikavkaz players
FC KAMAZ Naberezhnye Chelny players
FC Fakel Voronezh players
FC Zhemchuzhina Sochi players
Russian Premier League players
Association football defenders
FC Dynamo Bryansk players
FC Dynamo Vologda players
FC Mashuk-KMV Pyatigorsk players